Great Crosthwaite is a suburb of the tourist town of Keswick in the Allerdale district, in the Lake District, in the English county of Cumbria.

History 
It was the original settlement of Keswick.

Features 
Within Great Crosthwaite there is the Mary Hewtson Cottage Hospital, the Howard Allen Hall Sports Hall, Keswick School and Keswick Cycle Hire.

Transport 
For transport there is the A5271 road going past Great Crosthwaite and through Keswick town centre, the B5289 road nearby, the A591 road going south towards Kendal and Windermere and north towards Little Crosthwaite and Carlisle and the A66 road by-passing Keswick. There is a roundabout on the by-pass where the A66 road, the A591 road and the A5271 road meet, called Crosthwaite Roundabout.

Nearby waters 
Nearby waters include Derwent Water, the River Greta and the River Derwent are also nearby. Nearby settlements include Portinscale and Braithwaite.

References 
 A-Z Lake District

Populated places in Cumbria
Keswick, Cumbria